The 1960 Campeonato Ecuatoriano de Fútbol was the 2nd national championship for football teams in Ecuador. The tournament returned after a two-year hiatus using with the same format, but expanded the field of teams from four to eight. 

For the second season in a row, a Guayaquil team won the national championship. Barcelona won their first national title, which allowed them to participate in the 1961 Copa Campeones. They are the first Ecuadorian club to play in the continental tournament.

Qualified teams
The number of teams for this season expanded from four to eight. The qualified teams were the top four teams from the Guayaquil and Interandino leagues.

Standings

Results

References

Ecuadorian Serie A seasons
1960 in Ecuadorian sport
Ecu